Émines is a village of Wallonia and a district of the municipality of La Bruyère, located in the province of Namur, Belgium.

It was a municipality in its own right before the fusion of Belgian municipalities in 1977.

References

Former municipalities of Namur (province)